The ninth series of Warsaw Shore, a Polish television programme based in Warsaw, Poland was announced on 13 November 2017. The ninth season began airing on 18 March 2018. This will be the first series not to include Bartek Barański since he made his exit during the previous series. This was the final series to include original cast member Wojtek Gola following his decision to quit, as well Jacek Bystry and Jola Mróz after they were both axed from the show. The series also featured the brief return of three former cast members Jakub Henke, Alan Kwieciński and Mariusz "Ryjek" Adam.

Cast
 Alan Kwieciński (Episodes 7–11)
 Damian Zduńczyk
 Ewelina Kubiak
 Jacek Bystry (Episodes 1–2, 4–6)
 Jakub Henke (Episodes 7–9)
 Jola Mróz (Episodes 1–6)
 Anna "Mała" Aleksandrzak
 Marcin "Brzydal" Maruszak
 Piotr Polak
 Mariusz "Ryjek" Adam (Episodes 11–12)
 Wiktoria Sypucińska (Episodes 1–11)
 Wojciech Gola (Episodes 1–5)

Duration of cast

Notes 

 Key:  = "Cast member" is featured in this episode.
 Key:  = "Cast member" voluntarily leaves the house.
 Key:  = "Cast member" returns to the house.
 Key:  = "Cast member" leaves the series.
 Key:  = "Cast member" returns to the series.
 Key:  = "Cast member" is removed from the series.
 Key:  = "Cast member" does not feature in this episode.
 Key:  = "Cast member" is not a cast member in this episode.

Off screen exits 
 During the sixth episode, Jacek the Boss announced that Jola and Jacek had been removed from the house, and would not be returning for the remainder of the series. This led to the eventual departure of Jola and Jacek from the show.

Episodes

References 

2018 Polish television seasons
Series 9